The K265/266 Beijing-Jiamusi Through Train is a railway that runs from China's capital Beijing to Jiamusi. It carries express passenger trains for the Harbin Railway Bureau, Jiamusi passenger segment responsible for passenger transport task, Jiamusi originating on the Beijing train.

25G Type Passenger trains running along the Jingha Railway, Binbei Railway and Suijia Railway cross Heilongjiang, Jilin, Liaoning, Hebei, Tianjin, Beijing and other areas. The entire 1675 km. Beijing railway station to Jiamusi railway station requires 25 hours and 55 minutes. Jiamusi railway station to Beijing railway station to run 24 hours and 53 minutes.

See also 
K339/340 Beijing-Jiamusi Through Train

References 

Passenger rail transport in China
Rail transport in Beijing
Rail transport in Heilongjiang